Jamie Hampton and Ajla Tomljanović were the defending champions, but neither took part in 2012.

Jacqueline Cako and Natalie Pluskota won the title, defeating Eugenie Bouchard and Ulrikke Eikeri in the final, 6–3, 2–6, [10–4].

Seeds

Draw

References 
 Main draw

Goldwater Women's Tennis Classic - Doubles